The Women's 3000 metres event  at the 2006 IAAF World Indoor Championships was held on March 11.

Results

References
Results

3000
3000 metres at the World Athletics Indoor Championships
2006 in women's athletics